The Roanoke Maroons are the athletic teams that represent Roanoke College, located in Salem, Virginia, a suburban independent city adjacent to Roanoke, Virginia.

Roanoke is an NCAA Division III member competing in the Old Dominion Athletic Conference; the Maroons were a founding member of the conference in 1976.  The college fields teams in 12 men's and 11 women's sports.

History
Roanoke athletics began in 1870 when the college fielded its first baseball team. The men's basketball program, added in 1911, received national recognition in 1939 when the team finished third in the National Invitational Tournament, the premiere postseason tournament of that era; and with more than 1,300 wins (almost 2,000 games played; better than 60% winning percentage over more than 90 years) is among the most successful in the nation. The "Five Smart Boys" of the 1937 through 1939 seasons were Guard John Wagner; 'Bounding' Bob Lieb; Forwards Paul Rice; Gene Studebaker and Center Bob Sheffield. Frankie Allen, arguably the greatest men's basketball player in Virginia college sports (2,780 points and 1,758 rebounds), graduated from Roanoke in 1971.

Men's lacrosse and men's basketball are the school's most popular, and historically most successful sports at the college.  However, a number of other teams have made significant NCAA tournament runs and claimed ODAC titles in recent years.  Most notably, the school's baseball team in 2017, who entered the ODAC Tournament as the conference's 6th seed, went on a run to win the title before sweeping the South Region and making an appearance in the Division III College World Series in Appleton, Wisconsin.  The team finished the season #3 in the national rankings. With the addition of men's volleyball at the college, a sport not sponsored by the ODAC, Roanoke joined the Continental Volleyball Conference: a Division III men's volleyball conference that two fellow ODAC members call home for their men's volleyball programs (Eastern Mennonite and Randolph-Macon). 

In 1900, Roanoke helped serve as a founding member of the Virginia Intercollegiate Athletic Association, but quickly left the association.  Roanoke later re-joined as a non-football member from 1915 to 1918.

Conference and National Championships
Roanoke teams have won two national championships:  
 1972 NCAA Division II men's basketball championship: Salem native Hal Johnston led the Maroons to the national title in Evansville, Indiana.  Roanoke defeated the George Gervin-led Eastern Michigan Eagles in the semifinals before dispatching the Akron Zips in the championship game by a score of 84–72.  Johnston was subsequently named tournament MVP.
 1978 NCAA Division II Lacrosse Championship: The men's lacrosse team won the national championship by defeating the Hobart Statesmen who were two-time defending national champions at the time 14-13 in Geneva, New York.

The school also boasts two individual national championships:
 2001: Roanoke athlete Casey Smith won an individual national championship in the Division III women's 10,000m track and field event.  
 2009: Robin Yerkes secured an individual national championship for Roanoke when she won the Division III women's 400m track and field event. Yerkes is the most decorated athlete ever to graduate from Roanoke, earning 12 All-American honors in multiple events.

As of May 2013, teams at Roanoke College have won 101 conference championships (47 in men's sports, 54 in women's sports) since the college joined the ODAC as a founding member in 1976.  Roanoke has won more conference championships than any other ODAC school in men's lacrosse with 18 titles and women's basketball with 13 titles. Roanoke, Hampden-Sydney College, and Randolph-Macon College are tied for the most conference championships in men's basketball with 10 titles each.

Varsity teams

List of teams

Men's sports
 Baseball
 Basketball
 Cross Country
 Golf
 Lacrosse
 Soccer
 Swimming
 Tennis
 Track & Field
 Volleyball
 Wrestling

Women's sports
 Basketball
 Cross Country
 Field Hockey
 Lacrosse
 Soccer
 Softball
 Swimming
 Tennis
 Track & Field
 Volleyball

Football
Roanoke's football program was discontinued during World War II after more than 60 years of competition. Initially a club sport, the first varsity game occurred in 1892 against Allegheny Institute. The college's final game was played against Catawba College on November 13, 1942 which resulted in a 42–0 loss.

In 1985, the Salem city government constructed an 8,000 seat stadium, Salem Football Stadium adjacent to Roanoke's Elizabeth Campus, two miles from the main campus, location of athletic fields and residence halls.  Constructed for the football team at nearby Salem High School where many hoped the college would revive its football program and that the team would play in the stadium, but the college declined. The stadium has hosted the NCAA Division III Football Championship game from 1993 to 2017 even though Roanoke does not compete in the sport.

Rivalries

Roanoke College and Washington and Lee University have been rivals for more than a century.  The rivalry, strongest in men's lacrosse, is fueled by a long history of competition; the schools have competed against each other since the 1870s.  The rivalry is also influenced by conference affiliation and geography; the schools are both charter members of the Old Dominion Athletic Conference and are located about 50 miles from each other on Interstate 81.  Both schools historically have had nationally ranked men's lacrosse teams and have been ranked in the top twenty when meeting late in the season. In addition to Washington and Lee, matches against the University of Lynchburg, Hampden-Sydney College, Randolph-Macon College, and Bridgewater College tend to draw the most interest; all of which are members of the Old Dominion Athletic Conference.

Roanoke and Virginia Tech were rivals in the late 19th and early 20th centuries when Virginia Tech was a small college.  In 1877, the schools competed in Virginia Tech's first intercollegiate baseball game (Virginia Tech won 53–13), and in 1896, Virginia Tech first wore its current athletic colors – Chicago Maroon and Burnt Orange – in a football game against Roanoke. In 1895, Roanoke and Virginia Tech were charter members of the now defunct Virginia Intercollegiate Athletic Association along with Randolph-Macon College, the University of Richmond, and the College of William and Mary, and in 1926, Roanoke and Virginia Tech played the inaugural football game at Virginia Tech's Miles Stadium.

School colors

Roanoke has two sets of school colors, blue and gold for academic use and maroon and gray for athletic use. This dates to 1907 when the baseball team needed new uniforms, but could not obtain any in blue and gold.  Maroon and gray uniforms were purchased as a substitute.  Within a few years, maroon and gray were adopted as Roanoke's official athletic colors.  The college athletic nickname became Maroons as well.  In recent years, black has been added as an accent color so Roanoke athletic uniforms are often maroon, gray, black, and white on some occasions.

Nickname and mascot

Roanoke's athletic nickname is the Maroons and the mascot is Rooney, a maroon-tailed hawk. The mascot was revealed on April 17, 2009 during the annual alumni weekend festivities. Roanoke has competed as the Maroons for over 100 years, but it was only a color without a mascot to represent the college.

Facilities
After beginning their history in the tiny, on-campus Alumni Gymnasium, the men's and women's basketball teams began playing their home games in the 6,820-seat Salem Civic Center arena in 1968.  While the team had a great deal of success there and won the program's only national title while calling the Salem Civic Center home, its large size and off-campus location hindered it.  In the 1980s, the school opened the 2,000-seat Bast Center located on-campus where the men's and women's basketball and volleyball teams played until 2016, when the state-of-the-art Cregger Center opened on-campus.  The new arena seats 2,500 spectators and sits on a hill with magnificent views of the Blue Ridge Mountains.

The baseball team formerly played at Kiwanis Field near Elizabeth Campus, but now plays at Haley Toyota Field, home stadium of the Salem Red Sox, Carolina League affiliate of the Boston Red Sox.  The softball team plays at the nearby James I. Moyer Sports Complex, which notably has hosted the NCAA Division III Women's College World Series on multiple occasions. Roanoke has qualified for this event several times with their most recent appearance being in 2012.

Cregger Center (2,500): Basketball, Volleyball, Wrestling
Kerr-Cregger Field House: Indoor Track & Field
Donald J. Kerr Stadium (3,000): Field Hockey, Lacrosse, Soccer
Haley Toyota Field (6,300): Baseball
James I. Moyer Sports Complex (1,000): Softball
Elizabeth Campus Complex: Tennis
Salem Family YMCA: Swimming
C. Homer Bast Track/Alumni Field Complex: Outdoor Track & Field

Individual sports

Achievements
2011–2012

On January 28, 2012, the men's basketball team defeated Eastern Mennonite University to win the 1,300th game in program history. Roanoke is one of only 20 NCAA Division III schools with that many victories.  With the win, Head Coach Page Moir achieved 375 victories; he is the winningest coach in ODAC history.

Roanoke completed the 2011–12 academic year with two ODAC championships:  women's outdoor track and field and softball.  The softball championship was Roanoke's eighth in the sport, the most of any school in conference history.  Roanoke finished second in the conference in golf and women's lacrosse.

The softball team defeated Christopher Newport University to win the NCAA Division III Regional Championship in Newport News, Virginia and advanced to the NCAA Division III World Series.  Roanoke ended the season ranked fourth in the nation after losses to Montclair State University and Linfield College.

Roanoke athletes won the top ODAC scholar-athlete of the year awards; golfer Brandon Ketron won the men's award, track athlete Sarah Witt won the women's award.  Roanoke and Washington and Lee University are the only schools to win both awards in the same year.  In addition, 91 Roanoke student-athletes were named to the ODAC All-Academic team.

Shelley Olds, a 2003 graduate of Roanoke College, finished seventh in the women's road race at the 2012 Olympic Games in London, the best result for an American cyclist since 1992.  Olds served as captain of the women's soccer team at Roanoke; she is a three-time national champion in two cycling disciplines, road and track.

2012–2013

Scott Allison retired as the head men's soccer coach in 2012 after 27 seasons at the helm of the program; in his final season, the team won the ODAC championship and advanced to the opening round of the NCAA Division III tournament.  Allison was named South Atlantic Regional Coach of the Year and Virginia College Division Coach of the Year; he continues to serve as Roanoke's director of athletics.

Roanoke won a total of four ODAC championships during the 2012–13 academic year:  men's soccer, women's indoor track and field, women's outdoor track and field, and men's lacrosse.  The men's soccer team advanced to the NCAA Division III tournament; the team was defeated by Emory University.  The men's lacrosse team advanced to the NCAA Division III tournament as well, defeating Centre College before losing to Lynchburg College.  The softball team advanced to the NCAA Division III tournament as an at-large seed; the team was defeated by Christopher Newport University and Emory University.

Roanoke placed 111 student-athletes on the 2012–13 ODAC All-Academic team, the most in college history at the time.

References

External links